"Stupid Boy" is a song by Sarah Buxton from Almost My Record and her self-titled album, Sarah Buxton.

Stupid Boy may also refer to:
 "Stupid Boy", a song by the Gear Daddies from Billy's Live Bait
 "Stupid Boy", a song by T. Mills
 "Stupid Boy", a song by Ronnie Radke from the 2014 mixtape Watch Me
 Stupid Boy (Garçon stupide), a 2004 film by Lionel Baier